Girl Time is a 1947 American concert film directed by Will Cowan.

Plot summary

Cast
Ina Ray Hutton as herself / Orchestra Leader
Nellie Lutcher as herself
Dorothy Costello as herself / Dancer (as The Costello Twins)
Ruth Costello as herself / Dancer (as The Costello Twins)
Lucita as herself
Tina Ramirez as herself / Dancer (as Tina and Coco)
Coco as herself / Dancer (as Tina and Coco)

Soundtrack
Ina Ray Hutton and Her Orchestra - "When My Sugar Walks Down the Street" (Written by Gene Austin, Jimmy McHugh and Irving Mills)
Lucita - "Hungarian Rhapsody No. 2" (Music by Franz Liszt)
Ina Ray Hutton and Her Orchestra - "Jamaica Rhumba" (Music by Gene de Paul, lyrics by Don Raye)
Nellie Lutcher - "He's a Real Gone Guy" (Written by Nellie Lutcher)
Ina Ray Hutton and Her Orchestra - "Granada" (Music by Agustín Lara)

External links

1947 films
Universal Pictures short films
Concert films
American black-and-white films
American musical films
1947 musical films
1940s English-language films
1940s American films